The Supreme People's Court of the People's Republic of China (SPC) is the highest court of the People's Republic of China. It hears appeals of cases from the high people's courts and is the trial court for cases about matters of national importance. The court also has a quasi-legislative power to issue judicial interpretations and adjudication rules on court procedure.

According to the Chinese constitution, the Supreme People's Court is accountable to the National People's Congress, which prevents the court from functioning separately and independently of the governmental structure. The court has about 400 judges and more than 600 administrative personnel.

The court serves as the highest court for the People's Republic of China and also for cases investigated by the Office for Safeguarding National Security in Hong Kong. The special administrative regions of Hong Kong and Macau have separate judicial systems based on British common law traditions and Portuguese civil law traditions respectively, and are out of the jurisdiction of the Supreme People's Court.

History
The Supreme People's Court was established on 22 October 1949 and began operating in November 1950. At least four members of the first court leadership did not come from a legal background, and most staff members came from the military.

The functions of the court was first outlined in the Chinese constitution in its 1954 version, which said the court has the power of independent adjudication and is accountable to the National People's Congress. 

During the Cultural Revolution, the 1975 constitution removed the provision that said courts were to decide cases independently and required them to report to revolutionary committees. Most staff members of the court were sent to the countryside, and the People's Liberation Army occupied the court from 1968 to 1973.

Following the end of the Cultural Revolution in 1976, the Supreme People's Court began to focus on legal issues, especially those related to civil and commercial law, because of China's economic liberalization under new leader Deng Xiaoping. The independent power of adjudicate cases returned to the constitution with the 1982 amendment, which explicitly states the courts' right of adjudication cannot be influenced by administrative organs, social organizations and individuals.

In 2005, the Supreme People's Court announced its intent to "[take] back authority for death penalty approval" over concerns about "sentencing quality", and the National People's Congress officially changed the Organic Law on the People's Courts to require all death sentences to be approved by the Supreme People's Court on 31 October 2006. A 2008 report stated that since the new review process, the court has rejected 15 percent of the death sentences decided by lower courts.

Since March 2023, the President of the Supreme People's Court and Grand Chief Justice has been Zhang Jun.

In 2013, the court began a blacklist of debtors with roughly thirty-two-thousand names. The list has since been described a first step towards a national Social Credit System by state media.

In 2015, the court began working with private companies on social credit. For example, Sesame Credit began deducting credit points from people who defaulted on court fines.

On 1 January 2019, the Intellectual Property Tribunal of the Supreme People's Court was established to handle all second instance hearings from cases heard in the first instance by the Intellectual Property Courts.

Functions

Adjudication 
The Supreme People's Court exercises its original jurisdiction over cases placed with the court by laws and regulations and those the court deems within its jurisdiction. It also reviews appeals or protests against trial decisions or verdicts of high people's courts and special people's courts, as well as appeals against court judgments lodged by the Supreme People's Procuratorate according to trial supervision procedures. When the court has discovered errors in the rulings and verdicts of lower courts that are already enforced, it investigates or appoints a lower court to rehear the case.

The court also approves death sentences and suspended death sentences handed down by lower courts. It also approves verdicts on crimes not specifically stipulated in the criminal law.

Legal interpretation 
The court explains the application of laws in specific cases during a trial. Further details about this were described by Zhou Qiang as:
 

While the Chinese constitution does not state that courts have the power to review laws for their constitutionality (see constitutional review), the Supreme People's Court can request the Standing Committee of the National People's Congress to evaluate whether an administrative rule, local regulation, autonomous regulation or separate regulation contravenes the constitution or a national law. However, the Supreme People's Court has never made such request.

Supervision of lower courts 
The Supreme People's Court is also responsible for supervising the adjudication of lower courts and specialized courts.

Organization 
 Divisions within the Supreme People's Court
 Case-Filing Division
 Criminal Divisions (5)
 Civil Divisions (4)
 Environment and Resources Division
 Administrative Division
 Judicial Supervision Division

 Departments within the Supreme People's Court
 State Compensation Division
 Enforcement Department (Enforcement Command Center)

 General Office
 Political Department
 Research office
 Adjudication Management Office
 Discipline and Supervision Department
 International Cooperation Department
 Judicial Administration and Equipment Management Department
 Party-Related Affairs Department
 Retirees'Affairs Department
 Information Department

 Circuit and other courts of the Supreme People's Court
 First Circuit (established in Shenzhen, Dec 2014)
 Second Circuit (established in Shenyang, Dec 2014)
 Third Circuit 
 Fourth Circuit 
 Fifth Circuit 
 Sixth Circuit
 First International Commercial
 Second International Commercial
 Intellectual Property Court

President/Chief Justices and Vice Presidents of the Court 
 1949–1954: Supreme People's Court of the Central People's Government
 President: Shen Junru
 1954–1959: Supreme People's Court of the People's Republic of China under the 1st National People's Congress
 President: Dong Biwu
 Vice Presidents: Gao Kelin, Ma Xiwu, Zhang Zhirang
 1959–1965: 2nd National People's Congress
 President: Xie Juezai
 Vice Presidents: Wu Defeng, Wang Weigang, Zhang Zhirang
 1965–1975: 3rd National People's Congress
 President: Yang Xiufeng
 Vice Presidents: Tan Guansan, Wang Weigang, Zeng Hanzhou, He Lanjie, Xing Yimin, Wang Demao, Zhang Zhirang
 1975–1978: 4th National People's Congress
 President: Jiang Hua
 Vice Presidents: Wang Weigang, Zeng Hanzhou, He Lanjie, Zheng Shaowen
 1978–1983: 5th National People's Congress
 President: Jiang Hua
 Vice Presidents: Zeng Hanzhou, He Lanjie, Zheng Shaowen, Song Guang, Wang Huaian, Wang Zhanping
 1983–1988: 6th National People's Congress
 President: Zheng Tianxiang
 Vice Presidents: Ren Jianxin, Song Guang, Wang Huaian, Wang Zhanping, Lin Huai, Zhu Mingshan, Ma Yuan
 1988–1993: 7th National People's Congress
 President: Ren Jianxin
 Vice Presidents: Hua Liankui, Lin Huai, Zhu Mingshan, Ma Yuan, Duan Muzheng
 1993–1998: 8th National People's Congress
 President: Ren Jianxin
 Vice Presidents: Zhu Mingshan, Xie Anshan, Gao Changli, Tang Dehua, Liu Jiachen, Luo Haocai, Li Guoguang, Lin Huai, Hua Liankui, Duan Muzheng, Wang Jingrong, Ma Yuan
 1998–2003: 9th National People's Congress
 President: Xiao Yang
 Vice Presidents:  Zhu Mingshan, Li Guoguang, Jiang Xingchang, Shen Deyong, Wan Exiang, Cao Jianming, Zhang Jun, Huang Songyou, Jiang Bixin
 2003–2007: 10th National People's Congress
 President: Xiao Yang
 Vice Presidents: Cao Jianming, Jiang Xingchang, Shen Deyong, Wan Exiang, Huang Songyou, Su Zelin, Xi Xiaoming, Zhang Jun, Xiong Xuanguo
 2008–2013: 11th National People's Congress
 President: Wang Shengjun
 Vice Presidents: Shen Deyong (Executive), Zhang Jun, Wan Exiang, Jiang Bixin, Su Zelin, Xi Xiaoming, Nan Ying, Jing Hanchao, Huang Ermei
 2013–2018: 12th National People's Congress
 President: Zhou Qiang
 2018—2023: 13th National People's Congress
 President: Zhou Qiang
 Vice Presidents: He Rong, Jiang Wei, Tao Kaiyuan, Gao Jinghong, Yang Wanming, Yang Linping, He Xiaorong, Shen Liang
 2023—present: 14th National People's Congress
 President: Zhang Jun

See also 
 Judicial system of China
 Supreme People's Procuratorate – China's highest prosecutor's office
 Three Supremes

References

External links 
 The Supreme People's Court of the People's Republic of China Official site.
 Chinacourt  English website sponsored by the Supreme People's Court, with court news and legal information including biographical information for the Grand Justices.
 PRC Laws  Links to English versions of the Constitution, General Principles of Civil Law, Administrative Procedure Law, Civil and Criminal Procedure Laws, and the Judges Law.
 The Supreme People's Court Court information in English, maintained at People's Daily Online.
 The Supreme People's Court of the People's Republic of China English website.
 The Presidents Mailbox – Reply to the "Supreme People's Court Disclosure of Various Judicial Basis Documents"

 
Judiciary of China
China
1949 establishments in China
Courts and tribunals established in 1949